Davis Lusimbo (born 23 July 1966) is a Ugandan former professional boxer who competed from 1997 to 2003, once winning the ABU light welterweight title. As an amateur he represented his country in the featherweight division at the 1992 Summer Olympics. He lost his first bout against Mohamed Soltani.

Professional boxing record

References

External links
 

1966 births
Living people
Ugandan male boxers
Light-welterweight boxers
African Boxing Union champions
Olympic boxers of Uganda
Boxers at the 1992 Summer Olympics